400 series may refer to:

Consumer graphics cards
 Radeon RX 400 series
 GeForce 400 Series

Japanese train types
 400 Series Shinkansen
 GV-E400 series, a DEMU train operated by JR East
 Osaka Metro 400 series, an EMU train on order by Osaka Metro

Other
 400-series highways, a network of freeways in Southern Ontario, Canada
 Rover 400 Series, a small British family car
 GE-400 series, computers produced by General Electric in the 1960s
 Kodak DCS 400 series, a series of digital SLR cameras produced by Eastman Kodak

See also
 Series 4 (disambiguation)
 400 (disambiguation)
 4000 series